Bojana may refer to

Places
 Bojana (river), a river in Albania and Montenegro
 Ada Bojana / Bojana Island

Name
 Bojana (given name), a Slavic given name
 People
 Bojana Atanasovska
 Bojana Bobusic
 Bojana Jovanovski
 Bojana Novakovic
 Bojana Ordinačev
 Bojana Popović
 Bojana Radulović
 Bojana Živković